Honorato is both a given name and a surname. Notable people with the name include:

Honorato Hernández (born 1956), Spanish long-distance runner
Honorato Trosso (born 1970), Angolan basketball player
Carlos Honorato (born 1974), Brazilian judoka